The McWilliam's Wines Tournament was a golf tournament held in Australia from 1949 to 1953, played at The Australian Golf Club. Norman Von Nida won the event three of the five times it was contested. Total prize money was £2,500, increasing to £5,000 for the final event in 1953. The sponsor was McWilliam's Wines, an Australian wine producer.

Winners

References

Golf tournaments in Australia
Recurring sporting events established in 1949
Recurring events disestablished in 1953